Be Aitbaar (lit:Discredit) was a Pakistani drama series that began airing on 11 July 2016 on Hum TV and ended on 7 December 2016. It is written by Malik Khuda Baksh and directed by Shah Hussain. It stars Saba Faisal, Javed Sheikh, Kanwar Arsalan and Behroze Sabzwari.

Plot 
The story begins with Uzma (Saba Faisal) visiting her cousin Jameel (Javed Sheikh)  who is suffering from cancer. A flashback is shown revealing Uzma was raped in a train journey and becomes pregnant. Uzma's wedding was arranged with Jameel but he rejects her after this incident. Uzma and her son Salman (Zaryan Hassan) are accepted by Abdul Qadir, and later gives birth to a daughter Mahzeb (Maryam Tinwari). Jameel also got married and has a daughter Kamla. Jameel apologises to Uzma and later dies. Kamla, now an orphan girl moves to Uzma's house. Salman is attracted to Kamla at first sight.

Asad (Kanwar Arsalan) is a shopkeeper of clothes shop. A customer (Fiza) is crazy about him but he does not share these feelings. Asad has a brother, Azaan (Salman Faisal) and his parents are (Birjees Farooqui) and Kamal (Hashim Butt). Azaan and Mahzeb are deeply in love with each other. But his mother disapproves and would like her sons to marry in a high class.

After Asad saves Kamla from goons they fall in love and they get engaged. Before the wedding Salman and Asad engage in a fight resulting in Asad accidentally getting shot.

The another story starts from Asif (Behroze Sabzwari), introducing himself as Mahzeb's office teacher and uncle of Asad's fiancée Fiza (Shanzey Ali). Asif has a wife, Nausheen (Sabahat Bukhari), aunt of Zara (Sehra Asghar). Asif has a son, Sahir (Saqlain Bashir). Sahir has loved Kamla and goes to Kamla's home to propose her. Asif starts loving Kamla and marries her.

Cast 
 Javed Sheikh as Jameel (Dead)
 Saba Faisal as Uzma
 Kanwar Arsalan as Asad (Dead)
 Behroze Sabzwari as Asif
 Sabahat Ali Bukhari as Nausheen Begum
 Hashim Butt as Kamal
 Birjees Farooqui as Shagufta
 Sehrish Fatima as Kamla
 Saqlain Bashir as Sahir
 Marium Tinwari as Mahzeb
 Hasaan Khan as Salman
 Salman Faisal as Azaan
 Shanzey Ali as Fiza
 Sehra Asghar as Zara

See also 
 List of programs broadcast by Hum TV
 2016 in Pakistani television

References

External links 
 Official website

Pakistani drama television series
2016 Pakistani television series debuts
2016 Pakistani television series endings
Urdu-language television shows
Hum TV original programming
Hum TV